Palkino is a rural locality (a village) in Pertsevskoye Rural Settlement, Gryazovetsky District, Vologda Oblast, Russia. The population was 186 as of 2002. There are 5 streets.

Geography 
Palkino is located 20 km north of Gryazovets (the district's administrative centre) by road. Baksheyka is the nearest rural locality.

References 

Rural localities in Gryazovetsky District